A list of two foot six inch gauge railways in the United Kingdom.

Installations

Gallery

See also

British narrow-gauge railways
Heritage railway
2 ft and 600 mm gauge railways in the United Kingdom
2 ft 6 in gauge railroads in the United States
3 ft gauge railways in the United Kingdom
Large amusement railways
Three foot six inch gauge railways in the United Kingdom

References

External links
World-wide 30" Gauge Railways and Railroads